Alucita is the largest genus of many-plumed moths (family Alucitidae); it is also the type genus of its family and the disputed superfamily Alucitoidea. This genus occurs almost worldwide and contains about 180 species ; new species are still being described and discovered regularly. Formerly, many similar moths of superfamilies Alucitoidea, Copromorphoidea and Pterophoroidea were also placed in Alucita.

The genus Alucita was established by Carl Linnaeus in the 1758 10th edition of Systema Naturae as a subgenus of Phalaena, . Johan Christian Fabricius in 1775 seems to have been the first author to consider Alucita a genus in its own right, and it remains so until today. However, some subsequent authors believed Linnaeus' name to be invalid, and established alternative names for this genus, but, while the oldest of these, Pierre André Latreille's Orneodes, was used instead of Alucita for a long time, all these subsequent names are today recognized as junior synonyms.

Species
The species of Alucita are:

 Alucita abenahoensis
 Alucita acalles
 Alucita acalyptra
 Alucita acascaea
 Alucita acutata Scholz & Jackh, 1994
 Alucita adriendenisi B.Landry & J.-F.Landry, 2004
 Alucita adzharica 
 Alucita agapeta
 Alucita amalopis 
 Alucita ancalopa 
 Alucita anemolia 
 Alucita angustestriata 
 Alucita anticoma
 Alucita aramsolkiensis Gielis, 2009
 Alucita araxella 
 Alucita argyrospodia (Diakonoff, 1954)
 Alucita arriguttii 
 Alucita atomoclasta
 Alucita baihua 
 Alucita baliochlora (Meyrick, 1929)
 Alucita balioxantha
 Alucita beinongdai 
 Alucita bidentata Scholz & Jackh, 1994
 Alucita brachyphimus (Hering, 1917)
 Alucita brachyzona
 Alucita bridarollii 
 Alucita brunnea 
 Alucita budashkini Zagulajev, 2000
 Alucita bulgaria Zagulajev, 2000
 Alucita butleri
 Alucita canariensis Scholz & Jackh, 1994
 Alucita cancellata (Meyrick, 1908)
 Alucita capensis
 Alucita caucasica 
 Alucita certifica
 Alucita chloracta
 Alucita cinnerethella 
 Alucita coffeina
 Alucita compsoxantha
 Alucita crococyma
 Alucita cyanophanes 
 Alucita cymatodactyla Zeller, 1852
 Alucita cymographa (Meyrick, 1929)
 Alucita danunciae Vargas, 2011
 Alucita debilella Scholz & Jackh, 1994
 Alucita deboeri Gielis, 2009
 Alucita decaryella
 Alucita dejongi Gielis, 2009
 Alucita desmodactyla Zeller, 1847
 Alucita devosi Gielis, 2009
 Alucita dohertyi
 Alucita ectomesa
 Alucita entoprocta
 Alucita eteoxantha (Meyrick, 1929)
 Alucita eudactyla 
 Alucita eudasys (Diakonoff, 1954)
 Alucita eumorphodactyla 
 Alucita eurynephela (Meyrick, 1929)
 Alucita euscripta
 Alucita ferruginea
 Alucita flavicincta
 Alucita flaviserta
 Alucita flavofascia 
 Alucita fletcheriana
 Alucita fumosa 
 Alucita grammodactyla Zeller, 1841
 Alucita granata
 Alucita habrophila
 Alucita helena 
 Alucita hemicyclus
 Alucita hexadactyla – twenty-plume moth
 Alucita hofmanni 
 Alucita homotrocha
 Alucita huebneri Wallengren, 1859
 Alucita hypocosma 
 Alucita iberica Scholz & Jackh, 1994
 Alucita idiocrossa 
 Alucita illuminatrix
 Alucita imbrifera
 Alucita iranensis 
 Alucita ischalea 
 Alucita isodina
 Alucita ithycypha
 Alucita japonica 
 Alucita jujuyensis 
 Alucita karadagica Zagulajev, 2000
 Alucita kazachstanica 
 Alucita klimeschi Scholz & Jackh, 1997
 Alucita kosterini Ustjuzhanin, 1999
 Alucita lackneri Gielis, 2009
 Alucita lalannei B.Landry & J.-F.Landry, 2004
 Alucita libraria
 Alucita longipalpella
 Alucita loxoschista 
 Alucita lyristis 
 Alucita mabilabolensis Gielis, 2009
 Alucita magadis 
 Alucita major (Rebel, 1906)
 Alucita manneringi Gielis, 2009
 Alucita maxima 
 Alucita megaphimus
 Alucita melanodactyla
 Alucita mesolychna 
 Alucita microdesma (Meyrick, 1929)
 Alucita micrographa (Diakonoff, 1954)
 Alucita microscopica 
 Alucita molliflua
 Alucita montana Barnes & Lindsey, 1921 – Montana six-plume moth
 Alucita montigena 
 Alucita mulciber 
 Alucita myriodesma
 Alucita nannodactyla
 Alucita nasuta
 Alucita nephelotoxa 
 Alucita niphadosema (Diakonoff, 1954)
 Alucita niphostrota 
 Alucita nipsana Gielis, 2009
 Alucita nubifera 
 Alucita ochraspis (Meyrick, 1929)
 Alucita ochriprota
 Alucita ochrobasalis van Mastrigt & Gielis, 2009
 Alucita ochrozona 
 Alucita ordubadi 
 Alucita palodactyla Zeller, 1847
 Alucita panduris 
 Alucita panolbia
 Alucita papuaensis Gielis, 2009
 Alucita patria 
 Alucita pectinata Scholz & Jackh, 1994
 Alucita pepperella 
 Alucita phanerarcha
 Alucita philomela 
 Alucita photaula
 Alucita phricodes
 Alucita pinalea 
 Alucita pliginskii Zagulajev, 2000
 Alucita plumigera
 Alucita pluvialis 
 Alucita poecilodactyla 
 Alucita postfasciata 
 Alucita proseni 
 Alucita pselioxantha 
 Alucita pseudohuebneri 
 Alucita pterochroma (J.F.G.Clarke, 1986)
 Alucita punctiferella
 Alucita pusilla 
 Alucita pygmaea
 Alucita rhaptica 
 Alucita rhymotoma 
 Alucita riggii 
 Alucita ruens 
 Alucita rutteni Gielis, 2009
 Alucita sakhalinica 
 Alucita sailtavica 
 Alucita semophantis (Meyrick, 1929)
 Alucita sertifera
 Alucita seychellensis
 Alucita sikkima 
 Alucita spicifera
 Alucita stephanopis 
 Alucita straminea 
 Alucita syncophanta 
 Alucita synnephodactyla 
 Alucita tandilensis 
 Alucita tesserata
 Alucita thapsina 
 Alucita toxophila 
 Alucita trachydesma 
 Alucita trachyptera 
 Alucita tricausta 
 Alucita tridentata Scholz & Jackh, 1994
 Alucita ussurica Ustjuzhanin, 1999
 Alucita vanmastrigti Gielis, 2009
 Alucita walmakensis Gielis, 2009
 Alucita wamenaensis Gielis, 2009
 Alucita withaari Gielis, 2009
 Alucita xanthodes
 Alucita xanthosticta
 Alucita xanthozona (Diakonoff, 1954)
 Alucita "xanthozona" (J.F.G.Clarke, 1986)
 Alucita zonodactyla Zeller, 1847
 Alucita zumkehri Gielis, 2009
 Alucita zwieri Gielis, 2009

Notes

References

Alucitidae
Ditrysia genera
Taxa named by Carl Linnaeus